Planifilum composti  is a thermophilic and aerobic bacterium from the genus of Planifilum which has been isolated from compost in Korea.

References

External links
Type strain of Planifilum composti at BacDive -  the Bacterial Diversity Metadatabase

Bacillales
Bacteria described in 2013
Thermophiles